Gussalli may refer to:

Luigi Gussalli (1885-1950), Italian engineer and astronomer 
32944 Gussalli, a main-belt asteroid